Andrew Heiskell (September 13, 1915 – July 6, 2003) was chairman and CEO of Time Inc. (1960–1980), and also known for his philanthropy, for organizations including the New York Public Library. He was President of the Inter American Press Association (1961–1962) and president of the Harvard University Board of Overseers.

Biography
Heiskell was born in Naples, the second child of American parents, Ann Moore Hubbard and Morgan Ott Heiskell. His father was an artist and photographer whose work appeared in National Geographic. His parents had married in Wheeling, West Virginia and then moved to Capri, where they became part of a bohemian set, including the writer Compton Mackenzie, with whom his mother was rumored to have had an affair. After his parents split up, and he spent his childhood abroad with his mother and sister.

In 1946, aged just 30, he was named publisher of Life; in 1972, as chairman and CEO of Time, Inc., he had to close it down. In 1974 he created People, which rapidly became a great asset.

The Institute of International Education's Andrew Heiskell Award is named for him. Heiskell donated funds to pay for the Arts Director position at the American Academy in Rome.

One of his major achievements as a civic leader was the revitalization of New York's Bryant Park, which he undertook after time as chair of the New York Public Library. He also served for ten years as an overseer of Harvard University, after attending Harvard Business School without ever earning an undergraduate degree.

Personal life
Noted for his charm and height (he was 6'5"), Heiskell was married three times. His first wife was Cornelia Scott, and they had two children, Diane and Peter. His second wife was the Hollywood actress Madeleine Carroll, with whom he had a daughter, Anne Madeleine. In 1965, he married Marian Sulzberger Dryfoos, the widow of New York Times publisher Orvil Dryfoos.

Books
 Andrew Heiskell with Ralph Graves (1997), Outsider, Insider: An Unlikely Success Story, Marian-Darien Press,

References

External links
 1987 Columbia University Oral History Research Office interview
 2003 NY Times obituary
 Harvard Crimson obituary
 Variety obituary

1915 births
2003 deaths
20th-century American journalists
Maria Moors Cabot Prize winners
National Humanities Medal recipients
20th-century American philanthropists
American expatriates in Italy